Duncan Oughton (born 14 June 1977 in Karori) is a retired New Zealand association football player. Oughton played professionally in the United States for Major League Soccer club Columbus Crew and represented New Zealand internationally. He was an assistant coach for Toronto FC until 31 October 2014, when the team let Ryan Nelsen and five of his assistant coaches go. Today he is the host of the T.V. series Soccer & Beer.

Career

Youth and college
Oughton attended the University of Otago in New Zealand, before moving to the United States to play college soccer at Cal State Fullerton from 1997 to 2000. As a senior as CS Fullerton, he scored 17 goals and was credited with 8 assists.

Professional
Upon graduating, Oughton was selected 10th overall in the 2001 MLS SuperDraft by Columbus Crew. Oughton immediately found playing time with the Crew, playing 20 games as a rookie, including 12 starts. He maintained a starting role for the Crew for the majority of his early career, in part due to his ability to play numerous positions in the midfield and defence. Oughton missed the entire 2005 season with a knee injury and was released in May 2006. However, he continued to train with the team, and in August 2006 the team waived Leonard Bisaku and re-signed Oughton. However, Oughton's playing time with the Crew became more sporadic; he made just nine first team appearances in 2006 and only five in 2008. In 2009, Oughton scored a bicycle kick goal against USL 1st Division Rochester Rhinos in a US Open Cup match, however, the Crew lost in penalties, with Oughton's being saved. In the 2009 MLS season, Oughton had been given the chance to be back in the first team and was rewarded with two straight starts, earning an assist.

After the 2010 MLS season Columbus declined Oughton's contract option, and he elected to participate in the 2010 MLS Re-Entry Draft. Oughton became a free agent in Major League Soccer when he was not selected in the Re-Entry draft.

On 3 February 2011 Oughton announced his retirement from playing and was hired as the Assistant Technical Director for Columbus.

International
Oughton has represented the New Zealand national team, on numerous occasions. He received his first cap in 2002 in a win over Tahiti in the Oceania Nations Cup and went on to make 25 appearances and score 2 goals in A-internationals.

He was a member of New Zealand's 2003 FIFA Confederations Cup squad, and had a second taste of the big tournament atmosphere when he was named as part of the 2009 FIFA Confederations Cup squad to travel to South Africa. His final appearance for New Zealand was as a second-half substitute in the 2–0 loss to South Africa on 17 June 2009.

International goals

Coaching career
After retiring, Oughton joined the staff of the Crew, serving as an assistant coach in addition to serving as assistant technical director. He also served as analyst on regional television broadcasts of the club on Ohio News Network and later Fox Sports Ohio. In March 2013, Oughton was a candidate to replace Ricki Herbert as head coach of the Wellington Phoenix. During the 2013 season, he left Columbus to join the staff of Toronto FC, where he serves as an assistant to former international teammate Ryan Nelsen. Oughton holds a "B" license by the United States Soccer Federation.

Television career 
Since 2015 Oughton has been the host and a producer for the show Soccer & Beer. The show centers around him exploring soccer cultures around the world and the drinks people celebrate with.

Honors

Columbus Crew
Major League Soccer MLS Cup (1): 2008
Major League Soccer Supporters Shield (3): 2004, 2008, 2009
Lamar Hunt US Open Cup (1): 2002

References

External links
 
 

1977 births
Living people
Columbus Crew players
Cal State Fullerton Titans men's soccer players
New Zealand association footballers
New Zealand international footballers
Association footballers from Wellington City
New Zealand expatriate association footballers
Major League Soccer players
Columbus Crew draft picks
Columbus Crew non-playing staff
Toronto FC non-playing staff
Association football defenders
Expatriate soccer players in the United States
New Zealand expatriate sportspeople in the United States
2002 OFC Nations Cup players
2003 FIFA Confederations Cup players
2004 OFC Nations Cup players
2008 OFC Nations Cup players
2009 FIFA Confederations Cup players